Frank A. Emilio (born August 31, 1935, in Haverhill, Massachusetts) is an American politician who represented the 3rd Essex district in the Massachusetts House of Representatives from 1981 to 1991. Prior to serving in the House, he spent six years as a Haverhill City Councilor.

Emilio was defeated by Haverhill City Councilor Brian Dempsey in the 1990 Democratic primary.

References

1935 births
Democratic Party members of the Massachusetts House of Representatives
Politicians from Haverhill, Massachusetts
Living people
Massachusetts city council members